Amolinia is a genus of flowering plants in the family Asteraceae, described as a genus in 1972.

There is only one known species, Amolinia heydeana, native to Chiapas and Guatemala.

References

Flora of Chiapas
Flora of Guatemala
Monotypic Asteraceae genera
Eupatorieae
Plants described in 1972